Rhodobium gokarnense is a phototrophic bacterium species from the genus of Rhodobium which has been isolated from soil in Gokarna in India.

References

Further reading

External links 
Type strain of Rhodobium gokarnense at BacDive -  the Bacterial Diversity Metadatabase

Hyphomicrobiales
Bacteria described in 2007